Cursed is the fourth studio album by the Canadian mathcore band Ion Dissonance, released on August 24, 2010 through Century Media in North America, Doom Patrol Records in Japan, and Basick Records in Europe. This is the first Ion Dissonance album to feature 8-string guitars as well as clean vocals, as the song "Pallor" is the first Ion Dissonance song to ever feature clean singing.

Track listing

Personnel 
 Kevin McCaughey – vocals
 Antoine Lussier – guitar
 Sebastien Chaput – guitar
 Yannick Desgroseillers – bass
 Jean-François Richard – drums

References

2010 albums
Ion Dissonance albums
Basick Records albums
Century Media Records albums